Stepan Georgevich Shaumian (Step’an Ge'vorgi Shahumyan; 1 October 1878 – 20 September 1918) was an Armenian Bolshevik revolutionary and politician active throughout the Caucasus. Shahumyan was an ethnic Armenian and his role as a leader of the Russian revolution in the Caucasus earned him the nickname of the "Caucasian Lenin", a reference to the leader of the Russian Revolution, Vladimir Lenin.

The founder and editor of several newspapers and journals, Shaumian is best known as the head of the Baku Commune, a short lived committee appointed by Lenin in March 1918 with the task of leading the revolution in the Caucasus and West Asia. His tenure as leader of the Baku Commune was marred with numerous problems including ethnic violence between Baku's Armenian and Azerbaijani populations, attempting to defend the city against an advancing Turkish army, all the while attempting to spread the cause of the revolution throughout the region. Unlike many of the other Bolsheviks at the time however, he preferred to resolve many of the conflicts he faced peacefully, rather than with force and terror.

Shaumian was known by various aliases, including "Suren", "Surenin" and “Ayaks". As the Baku Commune was voted out of power in July 1918, he and his followers, known as the 26 Baku Commissars abandoned the city, fleeing across the Caspian Sea. He and the rest of the Commissars were captured and executed by anti-Bolshevik forces on 20 September 1918.

Early life

Stepan Gevorgi Shaumian was born in Tiflis, Georgia, then part of the Russian Empire, to a family of Armenian cloth merchants. He became involved in revolutionary politics as a student in Tiflis (Tbilisi). He graduated in 1898, and entered the Riga Polytechnic Institute, but left when his family ran into financial difficulties, and found work as a proof reader. In 1899, he formed Armenia's first Marxist group, in a village near Stepanavan. He returned to Riga in 1900, and joined the Russian Social Democratic Party (RSDLP), but in 1901, he was expelled, arrested, and exiled back to Transcaucasia.

Revolutionary beginnings
In spring 1902, Shaumyan enrolled in the philosophy department of Humboldt University of Berlin, from which he graduated in 1905. In Europe, he met with such exiles from the Russian Empire as Lenin, Julius Martov and Georgi Plekhanov, and was present at the 2nd Congress of the RSDLP, in London, at which the party split into factions, and Shaumyan sided with Bolsheviks.

Shaumyan returned to Tiflis in 1904, obtained a job as a teacher, while working illicitly as a Bolshevik organiser.  of the Bolshand became a teacher, and the leader of local Social Democrats in Tiflis, as well as a prolific writer of Marxist literature. By 1907 he had moved to Baku to head up the significant Bolshevik movement in the city. Joseph Stalin, then known as 'Koba' was also based in Baku. They clashed. Shaumian was arrested on May Day, 1909, but was released after his employer interceded on his behalf, and accused 'Koba' of being a police agent, as the only person who had known the address of the safe house where he had been hiding. This accusation against Stalin was never proved, and Shaumian apparently accepted his denials, because they continued to collaborate.  

In 1914, Shaumian led the general strike in Baku. The strike was crushed by Imperial Army and Shaumian was arrested and sent to prison. He escaped just as the February Revolution of 1917 was beginning.

The Baku Commune

Early problems

Following the October Revolution (which was centred in Saint Petersburg/Petrograd and Moscow, and thus had little effect on Baku), Shaumian was made Commissar Extraordinary for the Caucasus and Chairman of the Baku Council of People's Commissars. The government of the Baku Commune consisted of an alliance of Bolsheviks, Left Socialist-Revolutionaries, Mensheviks and Dashnaks.

In March 1918 the leaders of Baku Commune disarmed a group of Azerbaijani soldiers, who came to Baku from Lenkoran on the ship called Evelina to attend the funeral of Mamed Taghiyev, son of the millionaire Zeynalabdin Taghiyev. In response, a huge crowd gathered in the yard of one of the Baku mosques and adopted a resolution demanding the release of the rifles confiscated by the Soviet from the crew of the Evelina. The Azerbaijani Bolshevik organization Hümmet attempted to mediate the dispute by proposing that the arms were taken from the Savage Division to be transferred to the custody of Hümmet. Shaumian agreed to this proposal. But on the afternoon of 31 March, when Muslim representatives appeared before the Baku Soviet leadership to take the arms, shots were already heard in the city and the Soviet commissar Prokofy Dzhaparidze refused to provide arms and informed the Hümmet leadership that "Musavat had launched a political war". While it was not established who fired the first shot, the Baku Commune leaders accused the Muslims of starting the hostilities, and with the support of Dashnak forces attacked the Muslim quarters:

On the morning of 1 April 1918, the Committee of Revolutionary Defense of the Baku Soviet issued a leaflet with the message:

Bolsheviks had only about 6,000 loyal troops, and they were forced to seek support from either Muslim Musavat or Armenian Dashnaktsutyun. Shaumian, himself an Armenian, chose the latter. Shaumian considered the March events to be a triumph of the Soviet power in the Caucasus:

According to Firuz Kazemzadeh, the Baku Soviet provoked the March events to eliminate its most formidable rival: the Musavat. However, when Soviet leaders reached out to ARF for assistance against the Azerbaijani nationalists, the conflict degenerated into a massacre with the Armenians killing the Muslims irrespective of their political affiliations or social and economic position. Estimates of the number of Azerbaijanis and other Muslims massacred in Baku and surrounding regions range between 3,000 and 12,000.

The Committee of Revolutionary Defense issued another proclamation early in April 1918, which insisted on an anti-Soviet character of the rebellion and blamed Musavat and its leadership for the events. The Soviet's statement asserted that there was a carefully laid out plot by Musavat to overthrow the Baku Soviet and to establish its own regime:

Less than six months later, in September 1918, Nuri Pasha's Ottoman-led Army of Islam, supported by local Azeri forces, recaptured Baku and subsequently killed an estimated 10,000 to 20,000 ethnic Armenians.

The Bolsheviks clashed with Dashnaks and Mensheviks over the involvement of British forces, which the latter two welcomed. In either case, Shaumian was under direct orders from Moscow to refuse aid offered by the British. However, he understood the consequences of not accepting British aid, including a further massacre of Armenians by the Turks. Major Ranald MacDonell, a seasoned diplomat and the British vice-consul of Baku, was tasked by his superiors to persuade Shaumian to reconsider British support.

Coup plots

In mid-summer, MacDonell personally visited Shaumian's home in Baku and the two discussed the issue of British military involvement in a generally amiable conversation. Shaumian first raised the spectre of what British involvement would entail: "Is your General Dunsterville [the head of the military force awaiting orders to enter Baku] coming to Baku to turn us out?" MacDonell reassured him that Dunsterville, being a member of the military, was not claiming any political stake in the conflict but was merely interested in helping him defend the city. Unconvinced, Shaumian replied, "And you really believe that a British general and a Bolshevik commissar would make good partners....No! We will organise our own force to fight the Turk."

Shaumian was under the impression that the Bolsheviks would soon be sending reinforcements from the Caspian Sea to assist him, although that prospect remained highly unlikely. He had sent numerous telegrams to Moscow extolling the fighting abilities of his Armenian units but warned that they too, would soon be unable to halt the advance of Enver's army. With this, MacDonell's and Shaumian's conversation ended with the possibility of accepting British aid in exchange for complete Bolshevik control over the military force, terms the British could not immediately accept.

Relations between the Baku Commune and the British soon reached a turning point when Britain decided to reverse its support for Bolsheviks. Shaumian's intransigence had cost him their support, MacDonell was told by a British officer: "the new policy of the British and French governments was to support the anti-Bolshevik forces....It mattered little whether they were Tsarist or Social Revolutionary."

Over the previous days, numerous people had visited MacDonell, pleading for a withdrawal of British support for Shaumian. Many claimed to be former Tsarist officers offering their service to rise against the Bolsheviks, though MacDonell reportedly suspected them to have been agents working on behalf of the Bolsheviks.

Expulsion
On 26 July 1918, the Bolsheviks were outvoted 259-236 in the Baku Soviet. Shaumian's support had eroded and many of his key supporters abandoned him. Angered with the outcome of the vote, he announced that his party would withdraw from the Soviet and Baku itself: "With pain in our hearts and curses on our lips, we who had come here to die for the Soviet regime are forced to leave."

A new government headed primarily by Russians, known as Central Caspian Dictatorship (Diktatura Tsentrokaspiya) was formed, as British forces under General Lionel Dunsterville occupied Baku the same day.

Arrest and death

On 31 July 1918, the 26 Baku Commissars attempted the evacuation of Bolshevik armed troops by sailing over the Caspian Sea to Astrakhan, but the ships were captured on 16 August by the military vessels of the Central Caspian Dictatorship. The Commissars were arrested and placed in Baku prison. On 28 August, Shaumian and his comrades were elected in absentia to the Baku Soviet. On 14 September, amidst the confusion as Baku fell to Turkish forces, Shaumian and his fellow commissars either escaped or were released. In the most widely accepted version of events a group of Bolsheviks headed by Anastas Mikoyan broke into the prison and released Shaumian. He and the other commissars then boarded a ship to Krasnovodsk, where upon arrival he was promptly arrested by anti-Bolshevik elements led by their commandant, Kuhn. Kuhn then requested further orders from the "Ashkhabad Committee", led by the Socialist Revolutionary Fyodor Funtikov, about what should be done with them.

Three days later, the British Major-General Wilfrid Malleson, on hearing of their arrest, contacted Britain's liaison-officer in Ashgabat, Captain Reginald Teague-Jones, to suggest that the commissars be handed over to British forces in Meshed to be used as hostages in exchange for British citizens held by the Soviets. That same day, Teague-Jones attended the Committee's meeting in Ashgabat, which had the task of deciding the fate of the Commissars. For some reason Teague-Jones did not communicate Malleson's request to the Committee, and later claimed he left before a decision was made and did not discover until the following day that the committee had eventually decided to issue orders that the commissars should be executed. On the night of 20 September, Shaumian and the others were executed by a firing squad in a remote location between the stations of Pereval and Akhcha-Kuyma on the Trans-Caspian railway.

In 1956, the Observer published a letter written by a British staff officer who recounted a conversation he had had with Malleson, stricken with malaria at the time, on what was to be done to the commissars. Malleson replied that since the matter did not involve the British, they should not concern themselves with the issue. The telegram that was sent told the authorities holding the commissars to dispose of them "as they sought fit." Nevertheless, Malleson expressed his horror when he learned upon the ultimate fate that had befallen the commissars.

Reburial

In January 2009, the Baku authorities' demolition of the 26 Commissars Memorial commemorating the 26 Baku Commissars began and was soon completed. It upset Armenia, as the Armenian public believed that reburial is motivated by the reluctance of the Azerbaijanis to have ethnic Armenians buried in the center of their capital, due to the Nagorno-Karabakh War.

A scandal emerged when Azerbaijani press reported that only 21 bodies were found buried in the park, as "Shaumian and four other Armenian commissars managed to escape their murderers". It was denied by Shaumian's granddaughter Tatiana, now living in Moscow, who told the Russian daily Kommersant it was nonsense:It is impossible to believe that they weren't all buried. There is a film in the archives of 26 bodies being buried. Apart from this, my grandmother was present at the reburial.

Legacy

Following Shaumian's death, the Soviet government depicted him as a fallen hero of the Russian revolution. Shaumian's close relationship with Lenin also exacerbated the already heightened tensions between the British and the Soviets, who placed much of the blame on the British in complicity in the massacre.

"And today we say with pride and love, that the great son of Armenian people Stepan is also the son of Azerbaijani people, all people of Transcaucasia, all multinational and united Soviet people". Heydar Aliyev, the leader of Soviet Azerbaijan

Throughout the Soviet Union's existence, Khankendi in the Nagorno-Karabakh region of the Azerbaijan SSR was renamed as Stepanakert, after Shaumian. In 1992. The city of Jalaloghli in the Armenian SSR was also renamed, in Shaumian's honor, Stepanavan, a name it has retained in post-Soviet Armenia. Streets in Lipetsk, Yekaterinburg, Stavropol and Rostov-on-Don (Russia), an avenue in Saint Petersburg are named in Shaumian's honour. A statue of him erected in 1931 stands in Yerevan, the capital of Armenia.

Places named after Shaumian

Armenia
Stepanavan, Lori
Shahumyan, Ararat
Shahumyan, Armavir
Shahumyan, Lori
Shahumyan, Yerevan

Azerbaijan
Goygol, Goygol Rayon (formerly Shaumyan)
Aşağı Ağcakənd, Goranboy (formerly Shaumyan, a disputed area claimed by the de facto Nagorno-Karabakh Republic)
Şaumyanovka, (name changed to Məmişlər in 1992)

Russia
Shaumyan, Krasnodar Krai
Shaumyan, Stavropol Krai

Republic of Artsakh
Stepanakert, the capital of the de facto independent Republic of Artsakh
Shahumyan Region, a disputed area including Aşağı Ağcakənd, partially outside the de facto Republic of Artsakh, in Azerbaijan

Georgia
Shahumiani, Marneuli district, Kvemo Kartli

Ukraine
Shaumyan, Saky Raion, Crimea

References

Further reading
Suny, Ronald Grigor. The Baku Commune, 1917–18. Princeton: Princeton University Press, 1972;

External links

1878 births
1918 deaths
Armenian communists
Armenian revolutionaries
Executed politicians
Old Bolsheviks
Politicians from Tbilisi
People from Tiflis Governorate
Russian Social Democratic Labour Party members
Georgian people of Armenian descent
Russian people of Armenian descent
Russian communists
Russian Marxists
Russian revolutionaries
Riga Technical University alumni
People from Stepanavan
Articles containing video clips
Politicians from Baku